Nidamanoor is one of the 33 mandals in Nalgonda district of the Indian state of Telangana. It is under the administration of Miryalaguda revenue division. It comes under left canal of Nagarjuna Sagar Dam.

Nidamanoor Is Taluka Head Quarter Of Nagarjuna Sagar Assembly Constituency (Old Chalakurthy Constituency)

It consists of 19 villages including itself.

References

Mandals in Nalgonda district